The X Memorial of Hubert Jerzy Wagner was held at CRS Hall in Zielona Góra, Poland from 20 to 22 July 2012. Like the previous edition, 4 teams participated in the tournament.

Qualification
All teams except the host must receive an invitation from the organizers.

Venue

Results
All times are Central European Summer Time (UTC+02:00).

Final standing

Awards
Best Scorer:  Zbigniew Bartman
Best Spiker:  Michał Winiarski
Best Blocker:  Marcus Böhme
Best Server:  György Grozer
Best Setter:  Łukasz Żygadło
Best Libero:  Markus Steuerwald
MVP:  Bartosz Kurek

References

External links
 Official website

Memorial of Hubert Jerzy Wagner
Memorial of Hubert Jerzy Wagner
Memorial of Hubert Jerzy Wagner